Kirby House may refer to:

United Kingdom 

 Kirby House, Coventry

United States 

McKleroy-Wilson-Kirby House, Anniston, Alabama, listed on the NRHP in Calhoun County, Alabama
Evans-Kirby House, Harrison, Arkansas, listed on the NRHP in Boone County, Arkansas
Sage-Kirby House, Cromwell, Connecticut, NRHP-listed
Thomas Kirby House, Kendrick, Idaho, NRHP-listed
Judge Kirby House, Jeffersontown, Kentucky, listed on the NRHP in Jefferson County, Kentucky
Jesse Kirby Springhouse, Bowling Green, Kentucky, listed on the NRHP in Warren County, Kentucky
Kirby House (Live Oak, Florida), Historic architecture in Suwannee County, Florida
Kirby House (Trinity, Louisiana), listed on the NRHP in Louisiana
William R. Kirby Sr. House, Hillsdale, Michigan, NRHP-listed
Josiah Kirby House, Wyoming, Ohio, NRHP-listed
Nelson-Kirby House, Germantown, Tennessee, listed on the NRHP in Shelby County, Tennessee
Maxwell-Kirby House, Knoxville, Tennessee, NRHP-listed
Kirby-Hill House, Kountze, Texas, listed on the NRHP in Hardin County, Texas

See also
Kerby House, Prairieville, Alabama, NRHP-listed